Kolumna is a commuter railway station located in the town of Łask, Łódź Voivodeship, in Kolumna district. Initially, in years 1928-1973 it was serving the leisure settlement under the same name. It also serves as block post between Łask and Dobroń stations.

Overview 
The station consists of two side platforms and main building used for signalling control. The cash office was closed in 2015. A passage between platforms is provided through secured road crossing located next to the station.

The station serves only PolRegio regional trains from Łódź to Poznań and Wrocław, and ŁKA commuter trains to Sieradz.

Train services
The station is served by the following services:

 InterRegio services (IR) Ostrów Wielkopolski — Łódź — Warszawa Główna
 InterRegio services (IR) Poznań Główny — Ostrów Wielkopolski — Łódź — Warszawa Główna
 Regiona services (PR) Łódź Kaliska — Ostrów Wielkopolski 
 Regional services (PR) Łódź Kaliska — Ostrów Wielkopolski — Poznań Główny

References 

Railway stations in Poland opened in 1928
Railway stations in Łódź Voivodeship
Railway stations served by Łódzka Kolej Aglomeracyjna
Railway stations served by Przewozy Regionalne InterRegio